USS Cyrene (AGP-13) was a motor torpedo boat tender for the United States Navy. She was laid down as Cape Farewell, a Maritime Commission type (C1-A) hull under a Maritime Commission contract, at Pusey and Jones Corp., Wilmington, Delaware. Cyrene served in the Pacific from New Guinea to the Philippines from December 1944 to December 1945. The ship was decommissioned and placed in the Suisun Bay Reserve Fleet in July 1946 then withdrawn from the reserve fleet after sale to American Ship Dismantlers in December 1976.

Construction
Cape Farewell, Maritime Commission hull 891, contract 1095, was launched 8 February 1944 sponsored by Mrs. G. L. Coppage. The ship was completed 28 April 1944, delivered to the Maritime Commission and immediately transferred to the Navy.

Service history
The ship was acquired by the Navy on 28 April 1944 and commissioned as Cyrene 27 September 1944.

Departing Norfolk, Virginia 10 November 1944, Cyrene arrived at Manus on 13 December to escort two squadrons of motor torpedo boats to Hollandia, New Guinea. She then sailed on convoy duty to Leyte, arriving 1 January 1945.

Cyrene then served as tender for motor torpedo boats, and on 17 January 1945 became flagship for Commander, Motor Torpedo Boat Squadrons, 7th Fleet. After the war ended, she sailed from Samar on 21 December 1945 and arrived at San Francisco on 7 January 1946, reporting to the 12th Naval District for repair work in decommissioning small craft. Cyrene was decommissioned 2 July 1946 and delivered to the War Shipping Administration for disposal and placed in the Suisun Bay Reserve Fleet the same day.

Disposal
The ship was purchased by American Ship Dismantlers, Inc., awarded under PD-X-1011 17 November 1976 for non transportation use at $85,166.82 and physically delivered to the company 7 December 1976.

Other
Don Rickles, actor and comedian, served as a Seaman First Class aboard Cyrene.

One of her lifeboats is now in use at Rochester, England, where it has been converted into a live-aboard vessel.

Footnotes

References

External links
 Launching party for the C1-A freighter, Cape Farewell (Hagley Museum and Library)
 The freighter, Cape Farewell after launching (Hagley Museum and Library)
 C1-A freighter, Cape Farewell Hold #3 (Hagley Museum and Library)
 NavSource Online: Service Ship Photo Archive, USS Cyrene (AGP-13)
 "War on their Minds (2002)" (WW2 Project crew member interview)

 

Type C1-A ships
Ships built by Pusey and Jones
1944 ships
Motor torpedo boat tenders of the United States Navy
World War II auxiliary ships of the United States